The Arawak are a group of indigenous peoples of northern South America and of the Caribbean. Specifically, the term "Arawak" has been applied at various times to the Lokono of South America and the Taíno, who historically lived in the Greater Antilles and northern Lesser Antilles in the Caribbean. All these groups spoke related Arawakan languages.

Name

Early Spanish explorers and administrators used the terms Arawak and Caribs to distinguish the peoples of the Caribbean, with Carib reserved for indigenous groups that they considered hostile and Arawak for groups that they considered friendly.

In 1871, ethnologist Daniel Garrison Brinton proposed calling the Caribbean populace "Island Arawak" due to their cultural and linguistic similarities with the mainland Arawak. Subsequent scholars shortened this convention to "Arawak", creating confusion between the island and mainland groups. In the 20th century, scholars such as Irving Rouse resumed using "Taíno" for the Caribbean group to emphasize their distinct culture and language.

History

The Arawakan languages may have emerged in the Orinoco River valley. They subsequently spread widely, becoming by far the most extensive language family in South America at the time of European contact, with speakers located in various areas along the Orinoco and Amazonian rivers and their tributaries. The group that self-identified as the Arawak, also known as the Lokono, settled the coastal areas of what is now Guyana, Suriname, Grenada, Bahamas, Jamaica and parts of the islands of Trinidad and Tobago.

Michael Heckenberger, an anthropologist at the University of Florida who helped found the Central Amazon Project, and his team found elaborate pottery, ringed villages, raised fields, large mounds, and evidence for regional trade networks that are all indicators of a complex culture. There is also evidence that they modified the soil using various techniques such as adding charcoal to transform it into black earth, which even today is famed for its agricultural productivity.  According to Heckenberger, pottery and other cultural traits show these people belonged to the Arawakan language family, a group that included the Tainos, the first Native Americans Columbus encountered. It was the largest language group that ever existed in the pre-Columbian Americas.

At some point, the Arawakan-speaking Taíno culture emerged in the Caribbean. Two major models have been presented to account for the arrival of Taíno ancestors in the islands; the "Circum-Caribbean" model suggests an origin in the Colombian Andes connected to the Arhuaco people, while the Amazonian model supports an origin in the Amazon basin, where the Arawakan languages developed. The Taíno were among the first American people to encounter Europeans. Christopher Columbus visited multiple islands and chiefdoms on his first voyage in 1492, which was followed in 1493 by the establishment of La Navidad on Hispaniola, the first permanent Spanish settlement in the Americas. Relationships between the Spaniards and the Taíno would ultimately take a sour turn. Some of the lower-level chiefs of the Taíno appeared to have assigned a supernatural origin to the explorers. When Columbus returned to La Navidad on his second voyage, he found that the settlement had been burned down and all 39 men he had left there had been killed.

With the establishment of a second settlement, La Isabella, and the discovery of gold deposits on the island, the Spanish settler population on Hispaniola started to grow substantially, while disease and conflict with the Spanish began to kill tens of thousands of Taíno every year. By 1504, the Spanish had overthrown the last of the Taíno cacique chiefdoms on Hispaniola, and firmly established the supreme authority of the Spanish colonists over the now-subjugated Taíno. Over the next decade, the Spanish colonists presided over a genocide of the remaining Taíno on Hispaniola, who suffered enslavement, massacres, or exposure to diseases. The population of Hispaniola at the point of first European contact is estimated at between several hundred thousand to over a million people, but by 1514, it had dropped to a mere 35,000. By 1509, the Spanish had successfully conquered Puerto Rico and subjugated the approximately 30,000 Taíno inhabitants. By 1530, there were 1,148 Taíno left alive in Puerto Rico.

Taíno influence has survived even until today, though, as can be seen in the religions, languages, and music of Caribbean cultures. The Lokono and other South American groups resisted colonization for a longer period, and the Spanish remained unable to subdue them throughout the 16th century. In the early 17th century, they allied with the Spanish against the neighbouring Kalina (Caribs), who allied with the English and Dutch. The Lokono benefited from trade with European powers into the early 19th century, but suffered thereafter from economic and social changes in their region, including the end of the plantation economy. Their population declined until the 20th century, when it began to increase again.

Most of the Arawak of the Antilles died out or intermarried after the Spanish conquest. In South America, Arawakan-speaking groups are widespread, from southwest Brazil to the Guianas in the north, representing a wide range of cultures. They are found mostly in the tropical forest areas north of the Amazon. As with all Amazonian native peoples, contact with European settlement has led to culture change and depopulation among these groups.

Modern population and descendants

The Spaniards who arrived in the Bahamas, Cuba, and Hispaniola (today Haiti and the Dominican Republic) in 1492, and later in Puerto Rico, brought few women on their first expeditions. Many of the explorers and early colonists raped Taíno women, who subsequently bore mestizo or mixed-race children. Over subsequent generations, the remnant Taíno population continued to mix with Spaniards and other Europeans, as well as with other Indigenous groups and enslaved Africans brought over during the Atlantic slave trade. Today, numerous mixed-race descendants still identify as Taíno or Lokono.

In the 21st century, about 10,000 Lokono live primarily in the coastal areas of Venezuela, Guyana, Suriname, and French Guiana, with additional Lokono living throughout the larger region. Unlike many Indigenous groups in South America, the Lokono population is growing.

Notable Arawak
 Damon Gerard Corrie, Barbados Lokono of Guyana Lokono descent, radical International Indigenous Rights activist, and creator of the militant Indigenous Democracy Defence Organization/IDDO, the only such global Pan-Tribal & Multi-Racial Indigenous NGO in existence.  He is also the creator of the only Phonetic English to Arawak dictionary (2021),  and the only comprehensive books about Lokono-Arawak Culture called 'Lokono Arawaks' (2020),  and on traditional Lokono-Arawak spirituality in 'Amazonia's Mythical and Legendary Creatures in the Eagle Clan Lokono-Arawak Oral Tradition of Guyana', and another work that challenges the 'No natives were here when European settlement occurred colonial version of the history of Barbados in the book 'Last Arawak Girl Born in Barbados - a 17th Century Tale' (2021)   
 John P. Bennett (Lokono), first Amerindian ordained as an Anglican priest in Guyana, linguist, and author of An Arawak-English Dictionary (1989).
 Foster Simon, Artist,
 Oswald Hussein, Artist
 Jean La Rose, Arawak environmentalist and indigenous rights activist in Guyana.
 Lenox Shuman, Guyanese politician
 George Simon (Lokono), artist and archaeologist from Guyana.
 Tituba, The first woman to be accused of practicing witchcraft during the year 1692. See Salem witch trials for more information.

See also
Adaheli, the Sun in the mythology of the Orinoco region
Aiomun-Kondi, Arawak deity, created the world in Arawak mythology
Arawakan languages
Cariban languages
Classification of indigenous peoples of the Americas
Garifuna language
List of indigenous names of Eastern Caribbean islands
List of Native American peoples in the United States
Maipurean languages

References

Bibliography

 Jesse, C., (2000). The Amerindians in St. Lucia (Iouanalao). St. Lucia: Archaeological and Historical Society.
 Haviser, J. B.,Wilson, S. M. (ed.), (1997). Settlement Strategies in the Early Ceramic Age. In The Indigenous People of the Caribbean, Gainesville, Florida: University Press.
 Hofman, C. L., (1993). The Native Population of Pre-columbian Saba. Part One. Pottery Styles and their Interpretations. [Ph.D. dissertation], Leiden: University of Leiden (Faculty of Archaeology).
 Haviser, J. B., (1987). Amerindian cultural Geography on Curaçao. [Unpublished Ph.D. dissertation], Leiden: Faculty of Archaeology, Leiden University.
 
 Joseph, P. Musée, C. Celma (ed.), (1968). "LГhomme Amérindien dans son environnement (quelques enseignements généraux)", In Les Civilisations Amérindiennes des Petites Antilles, Fort-de-France: Départemental d’Archéologie Précolombienne et de Préhistoire.
 Bullen, Ripley P., (1966). "Barbados and the Archeology of the Caribbean", The Journal of the Barbados Museum and Historical Society, 32.
 Haag, William G., (1964). A Comparison of Arawak Sites in the Lesser Antilles. Fort-de-France: Proceedings of the First International Congress on Pre-Columbian Cultures of the Lesser Antilles, pp. 111–136
Deutsche, Presse-Agentur. "Archeologist studies signs of ancient civilization in Amazon basin", Science and Nature, M&C, 08/02/2010. Web. 29 May 2011.

External links

 
Indigenous peoples of the Caribbean
Indigenous culture of the Americas
Indigenous peoples of the Guianas
Ethnic groups in the Caribbean
Ethnic groups in Suriname
History of the Caribbean
History of Hispaniola
Spanish West Indies
History of indigenous peoples of the Americas
History of Îles des Saintes